The Tadamon massacre took place in the vicinity of Othman Mosque, Tadamon neighbourhood of the Syrian capital of Damascus, on 16 April 2013 during the Syrian civil war. Soldiers affiliated with the Syrian Armed Forces, specifically Branch 227 (Damascus branch) of the Military Intelligence Directorate, killed at least 41 civilians, and is suspected to be more than 280 civilians who were taken to one of the isolated neighborhoods of Damascus and executed one after the other in a mass grave that had been prepared in advance, as first reported in an investigation published in English by the American New Lines Magazine in coordination with Syrian Media collective Al Jumhuriya, in Arabic, and a report covering the investigation by the British newspaper The Guardian'. Syrian intelligence officer Major Amjad Yousef, who was filmed committing the massacre, was arrested shortly after the publication of the footage showing his involvement of the massacre in 2022 by the Syrian government.

Background
The massacre took place on 16 April 2013, when the rebel factions were preparing to enter the capital, Damascus, and start the battle to overthrow the regime. At that time, the Syrian regime forces controlled two-thirds of the Al-Tadamon neighborhood, while the opposition controlled the rest of the neighborhood. The massacre took place in the southeastern part of the neighborhood, specifically in an area that was close to the line of contact with the opposition on Daaboul Street, opposite the Othman Mosque.

Massacre
The massacre took place on 16 April 2013, when soldiers affiliated with the Syrian regime executed 41 people near the Othman Mosque in the Tadamon neighborhood, by throwing them into a hole prepared in advance in the middle of an uninhabited street. After they finished shooting the victims one by one, the regime soldiers set the bodies of the victims on fire by burning tires that had been previously placed at the bottom of the pit. The whole massacre took place in one day, and the soldiers filmed the details of the murders in full. During the executions, the victims' eyes were blindfolded with either duct tape or plastic wrap, and their hands were tied with a plastic strap usually used to collect and fix electrical cables.

Leaked footage and investigation
Footage of the executions was leaked onto the internet in April 2022, showing two men dressed in Syrian Army uniforms leading men to a pre-dug pit in a street, shortly before shooting them one at a time and then leaving the bodies in the pit. On 27 April 2022, the British newspaper The Guardian published a lengthy investigation describing the details of the massacre and several excerpts from the recording. The perpetrators were identified, following an investigation, as warrant-officer Amjad Youssef and NDF militiaman Najib al-Halabi, who himself was killed later in the war. During the video of the massacre one of the soldiers carrying out the executions addresses the camera lens, addressing his boss in the Syrian dialect, saying, "For your eyes, teacher, and for the eyes of the oil suit you wear." Amjad joined the Military Intelligence School located in the Maysaloun area in the Dimas suburb of Damascus in 2004, where he spent nine months of intensive training. In 2011 he joined Branch 227 of the Syrian Military Intelligence, notorious for being responsible for the arrest, torture and killing of a number of political opponents of the regime.

References

April 2013 events in Syria
April 2013 crimes in Asia
21st century in Damascus
Massacres of the Syrian civil war in 2013
Massacres of the Syrian civil war perpetrated by the Syrian Army
Damascus in the Syrian civil war